The Party of Albanian National Union (UNIKOMB - Partia e Unitetit Kombëtar Shqiptar) is a small political party in Kosovo.

At the last legislative elections, on 24 October 2004, the party was part of the Alliance for the Future of Kosovo, in which it won one seat.

The founder of the party was Halil Alidema.

References

Political parties in Kosovo